Jonoichthys is an extinct genus of marine ray-finned fish from the Upper Jurassic of Argentina. The type and only known species is Jonoichthys challwa. The fossil remains of J. challwa were recovered from the Vaca Muerta Formation, in Neuquén province, Argentina. It belongs to the family Aspidorhynchidae, within Aspidorhynchiformes.

References 

Prehistoric ray-finned fish genera
Tithonian life
Jurassic Argentina
Fossils of Argentina
Neuquén Basin
Fossil taxa described in 2015